Vadim Viktorovich Gryaznov (born 13 March 1986) is a Russian former professional football player.

Club career
He played in the Russian Football National League for FC Tekstilshchik-Telekom Ivanovo in 2007.

External links
 
 

1986 births
Footballers from Prague
Living people
Russian footballers
Association football defenders
FC Tekstilshchik Ivanovo players
FC Sheksna Cherepovets players
FC Spartak Kostroma players